A demon is a malevolent supernatural being in religion, occultism, mythology, folklore, and fiction.

Demon, daemon or dæmon may also refer to:

Entertainment

Fictional entities
 Daemon (G.I. Joe), a character in the G.I. Joe universe
 Dæmon (His Dark Materials), the term for a manifestation of a person's soul in Philip Pullman's trilogy
 Daemon (Digimon) (evil character from Digimon)
 Demon (Dungeons & Dragons), the most widespread race of fiends
 Demon (Supernatural), a fictional villains of series
 Daemon, a character in the TV series ReBoot
 Daemon Blackfyre, a character in George R. R. Martin's A Song of Ice and Fire series
 Demons (Shannara), characters in Shannara fantasy novels 
 Demon or Dimension traveler, a class of characters in the MythAdventures series
 Characters in the Artemis Fowl series
 Characters which appear in The Demonata, by Darren Shan
 Azazel (Supernatural), a character AKA "The Demon"
 Etrigan the Demon, a DC comics character

Films
 The Demon (1918 film), an American silent comedy film
 The Demon (1926 film), an American silent Western film
 Demons, a 1971 Japanese film directed by Toshio Matsumoto
 Demon (1976 film) or God Told Me To, an American horror film
 The Demon (1978 film), a Japanese drama film
 The Demon (1979 film), a South African slasher film
 Demons (1985 film), an Italian horror film
 Daemon (film), a 1985 British horror film
 Demon (2013 film), an American horror film
 Demon (2015 film), a Polish drama film
 Demons (2017 film), an American horror film

Publications
 Demon (comics), a comic by Jason Shiga
 The Demon, a DC Comics series starring Etrigan the Demon

Music

Albums 
 Demon (album), a 2014 album by Gazpacho
 Demons (Candlelight Red EP), 2012
 Demons (Cowboy Junkies album), 2011
 Demons (From Her Eyes EP), 2014
 Demons (Get Scared album), 2015
 Demons (Spiritual Beggars album), 2005
 Demon, an album by Envelopes
 Demons, a 2020 album by Nathan Cavaleri
 Daemon (Mayhem album), a 2019 album by Mayhem

Songs 
 "Demon" (song) (2011), by Jay Park
 "Demons" (Fatboy Slim song)
 "Demons" (Guster song)
 "Demons" (Imagine Dragons song)
 "Demons" (Brian McFadden song)
 "Demons" (James Morrison song)
 "Demons" (The National song)
 "Demons" (Sleigh Bells song)
 "Demons" (Super Furry Animals song)
 "Demon" (2003), by Trivium, bonus track on album Ember to Inferno
 "Demon" (2008), by KYPCK, on album Cherno
 "Demons" (2008), by Avenged Sevenfold, on album Diamonds in the Rough
 "Demons" (2011), by Fenech-Soler
 "Demons" (2013), by The Wanted, on album Word of Mouth
 "Demons" (2018), by Lil Wayne, on album Tha Carter V
 "Demons" (stylized in lowercase) (2019), by Kim Petras, on the album Turn Off the Light
 "Demons" (2019), by Hayley Kiyoko, on album I'm Too Sensitive for This Shit
 "Demons" (2020), by Drake, on album Dark Lane Demo Tapes
 "Demons" (2022), by Gothminister, on album Pandemonium

Other uses in music
 Daemon (band), co-founded by Nicke Andersson of The Hellacopters
 Demon (band), an English metal band formed in 1979
 Demons (band), a punk band from Sweden
 Demon Kakka, formerly known as Demon Kogure, a Japanese musician
 Demon FM, a community radio station in Leicestershire
 Demon Music Group, a British record label
 Daemon Records (2010), an independent record label

Books
 Daemon (novel series), a 2006 two-part novel by Daniel Suarez
 Demon (comics), a comic by Jason Shiga
 Demon (novel), by John Varley
 Demons (Dostoevsky novel), by Fyodor Dostoevsky
 Demons (Star Trek novel), a 1986 Star Trek: The Original Series novel
 The Demon (novel), by Hubert Selby, Jr.

Television

Programs
 Demons (TV series), a British TV series which aired in 2009
 The Dæmons, a 1971 Doctor Who serial

Episodes 
 Demon (Star Trek: Voyager), a 1998 episode of Star Trek: Voyager
 "Demons" (Star Trek: Enterprise), a 2005 episode of Star Trek: Enterprise
 "Demons" (Stargate SG-1)
 Demons (The X-Files), a 1997 episode of The X-Files television
 "eps1.3_da3m0ns.mp4", a 2015 episode of Mr. Robot
 The Demon (Arrow), an episode of Arrow
 "The Demon" (Yu-Gi-Oh! GX)

Computing
 Daemon (computing), a background process
 Daemon Tools, a disk image emulator
 Daemontools, a collection of free tools for managing Unix services
 Demon Internet, an Internet service provider
 BSD Daemon, a mascot for the BSD operating system

Religion, philosophy and mythology

Religion 
 Unclean spirit, an agent of a demonic possession

Philosophy 
 Demon (thought experiment), a class of hypotheses
 Laplace's demon (1814), articulation of causal or scientific determinism by Pierre-Simon Laplace
 Maxwell's demon, a concept by James Clerk Maxwell concerning the statistics of Second Law of Thermodynamics
 Evil demon, a philosophical concept originating with René Descartes
 Darwinian Demon, a hypothetical organism resulting from absence of biological constraints on evolution

Mythology 
 Daemon (classical mythology), a good or benevolent nature spirit in classical Greek mythology

People 
 Demon (musician) (born 1977), French electronic musician
 Blue Demon (born 1922), a professional wrestler and actor
 Finn Bálor (born 1981), in NXT and WWE
 Kane (wrestler) (born 1967), wrestler for WWE and WWF
 Alex de Minaur (born 1999), Australian tennis player nicknamed "Demon"
 Dale Torborg (born 1971), professional wrestler performing in WCW under the name "The Demon"
 Gene Simmons (born 1948), vocalist and bassist for the rock band Kiss, whose stage persona is "the Demon"

Places
Demon (volcano), Iturup Island, Kuril Islands, Russia
Demon, Togo
Demon Creek, a stream in Alaska
Algol, a star known colloquially as "the demon star"

Sports

Basketball 
 DePaul Blue Demons men's basketball, Chicago, Illinois
 Wake Forest Demon Deacons men's basketball, North Carolina
 Northwestern State Demons basketball, Natchitoches, Louisiana
 Northwestern State Lady Demons basketball, Natchitoches, Louisiana
 UCC Demons, Irish basketball team

Football and rugby
 Cardiff Demons, a Welsh rugby league team
 Casey Demons, an Australian rules football team 
 Melbourne Football Club, an Australian rules football team nicknamed the Demons
 Northwestern State Demons football, Natchitoches, Louisiana
 Perth Football Club, an Australian rules football team nicknamed the Demons

Other
 Canfield (solitaire) or Demon, a solitaire/patience card game
 Dæmonen, a roller coaster at Tivoli Gardens
 Demon (roller coaster), at Six Flags Great America and California's Great America
 Screamin' Demon, a shuttle loop roller coaster at Kings Island in Ohio
 "Demon" (poem), by Mikhail Lermontov
 The Demon (opera), by Anton Rubinstein
 Demon (UAV), an aircraft built by BAE Systems
 McDonnell F3H Demon, a United States Navy fighter aircraft
 Hawker Demon, a Royal Air Force biplane
 Demons (board game), a 1979 fantasy game
 Demon bat, common name for the Beelzebub's tube-nosed bat
 Demon butterflies, several species of the butterfly tribe Ancistroidini
 Demon owl, common name for the barn owl
 Dodge Demon, a high-performance variant of the Dodge Dart and Dodge Challenger automobiles

See also
 Daimon (disambiguation)
 The Demons (disambiguation)
 Demon (comics)
 Demonic (disambiguation)
 Devil (disambiguation)